Mindaugas Sinkevičius (born 20 June 1984, in Jonava) is a Lithuanian manager and politician,  Mayor of Jonava District Municipality (2011–2016 and since 2019),  former Minister of Economy of Lithuania (2016–2017) and Vice-Mayor of Jonava (2008–2011).

Biography 
Sinkevičius graduated from Jonava Senamiestis Gymnasium in 2003. He graduated from Vilnius University, Mykolas Romeris University and the ISM University of Management and Economics, defending his doctoral dissertation “Alcohol Consumption in the Context of Conflicting Societal and Personal Factors“ on 11 September 2015, at ISM.

Sinkevičius was active in social engagements and public organizations. A member of the Social Democratic Party of Lithuania, he was elected to the municipal council of Jonava District Municipality in 2007. In 2008, he became a vice-president of the Lithuanian Youth Council (LiJOT). In April 2011, at the age of 26, he was elected as the mayor of Jonava District Municipality by the municipal council. In 2015, Sinkevičius was reelected as the mayor in the first direct mayoral elections with 71.2 % of the vote.

At the end of 2016, he was appointed as the Minister of Economy on Skvernelis Cabinet, the 17th cabinet of the Republic of Lithuania. 

In 2017, he resigned from office at the Ministry of Economy of Lithuania.

From December 2017 to April 2019 was he Director of Uždaroji akcinė bendrovė „Jonavos vandenys“.

In 2019, Sinkevičius was reelected as the mayor in the  direct mayoral elections with 57.36 % of the vote.

Family 
Mindaugas Sinkevičius is a son of Rimantas Sinkevičius, a member of the Seimas and the Minister of Transport in the preceding Butkevičius Cabinet. His mother Ligita is a chief specialist at the Environmental Protection Agency under the Ministry of Environment. His sister Rūta is an assistant to a Vilnius district court judge.

Mindaugas Sinkevičius is married (since May 2017). His wife is Aistė Sinkevičienė (* 1989, Plūkaitė), an interior designer from Kaunas.

Sinkevičius lives with his family in his hometown Jonava.

Publications

References 

1984 births
Living people
Mayors of places in Lithuania
Politicians from Jonava
Vice-Mayors of Jonava
Social Democratic Party of Lithuania politicians
Ministers of Economy of Lithuania
Vilnius University alumni
Mykolas Romeris University alumni